Portneuf-sur-Mer is a municipality in the Côte-Nord region of the province of Quebec in Canada. The municipality is located at the mouth of the Portneuf River on the St. Lawrence River.

The municipality was known as Sainte-Anne-de-Portneuf prior to January 31, 2004.

Demographics

Population

Private dwellings occupied by usual residents: 291 (total dwellings: 370)

Mother tongue:
 English as first language: 0%
 French as first language: 99.2%
 English and French as first language: 0%
 Other as first language: 0%

See also
 List of municipalities in Quebec

References 

Municipalities in Quebec
Incorporated places in Côte-Nord
La Haute-Côte-Nord Regional County Municipality
Canada geography articles needing translation from French Wikipedia